Pratapgarh Assembly constituency may refer to
 Pratapgarh, Rajasthan Assembly constituency
 Pratapgarh, Tripura Assembly constituency
 Pratapgarh, Uttar Pradesh Assembly constituency